The US Army Small Ships Section was an improvised civilian fleet mobilized by Douglas MacArthur to provide logistical support to Allied Operations in the Pacific War. Between 1942 and 1945, over 4,372 Allied Merchant seaman served aboard commandeered civilian vessels "from Buna to the Philippines" - providing critical logistics under enemy fire.

History 
During the Philippines campaign, the Japanese offensive led to the entrapment of US Forces at Bataan - beyond the reach of assistance from a stretched United States Navy. As the campaign wore on, explorers John and Adam Fahnestock conceived the idea of improvising a civilian fleet to deliver supplies to the entrenched forces, under the codename 'Mission X.' From an affluent yachting family, their acquaintance with President Roosevelt may have played a role in the mission's ultimate authorisation.

On arriving in Melbourne, the Allied withdrawal from the Philippines led to the expansion of the ‘Mission X’ mandate into a broader logistical focus - formalised as an official Section of the Transportation Service stationed in Melbourne. Under the leadership of the Fahnestocks and Arthur R. Wilson, and with the support of Macarthur - the Section assumed a wider role in delivering ammunition, medical supplies and food to positions beyond the reach of conventional deep draft ships. From May 1942, the Section operated from Macarthur's Headquarters in the Grace Building - assembling an improvised flotilla at No. 10 Pier in Walsh Bay. Recruiting civilians deemed too young, old, or infirm for military service, the fleet grew to commandeer a flotilla of 35 fishing trawlers under Lend-Lease - ultimately expanding to include Dutch freighters and a First World War destroyer.

On the 18th of October 1942, the Section conducted its first amphibious assault - deploying the 128th Infantry Regiment ashore near Buna. Here, a vessel from the Section was notably commandeered by Major Archibald Roosevelt to supply critical artillery during the Battle of Scout Ridge.

The Section continued to serve under intensive fire throughout the Papuan and Philippine campaigns - variously collaborating  with the 2/7th Australian Battalion, 2nd Engineer Special Brigade, and Sixth United States Army during the Battles of Cape Gloucester, Hollandia, Leyte, Lingayen Gulf and Cebu for the duration of the war.

Legacy 
In 2009, the Australian Honours and Awards Tribunal expanded the eligibility criteria for campaign awards to Small Ships veterans. In 2010, the section was inducted into the US Army Transportation Corps Hall of Fame - recognizing the pivotal role played by the Section in sustaining the Allied liberation of the Pacific. A commemorate plaque now stands at the former site of the Sections Headquarters at the Grace Building.

Together, these acknowledgments recognize the essential role played by the Section in sustaining the South West Pacific Area Command during the Second World War.

References 

Ships of the United States Army
World War II naval operations and battles of the Pacific theatre